The Soviet Union's various constituent republics each had their own anthem (generally referred as a "state anthem").

History
The Russian Soviet Federative Socialist Republic was the last republic to adopt a state anthem, doing so in 1990. It had had none before this date, and used in its place the Soviet national anthem, which was "The Internationale" from 1917 to 1944 and the "National Anthem of the Soviet Union" from 1944 to 1990.

Unlike most national anthems, few of which were composed by renowned composers, the Soviet Union's various state anthems were composed by some of the best Soviet composers, including world-renowned Gustav Ernesaks (Estonia), Aram Khachaturian (Armenia), Otar Taktakishvili (Georgia), and Uzeyir Hajibeyov (Azerbaijan).

The lyrics present great similarities, all having mentions to Vladimir Lenin (and most, in their initial versions, to Joseph Stalin), to the guiding role of the Communist Party of the Soviet Union, and to the brotherhood of the Soviet peoples, including a specific reference to the friendship of the Russian people (the Estonian, Georgian and Karelo-Finnish anthems were apparently an exception to this last rule).

Some anthems' melody can be sung in the Soviet Union anthem lyrics (Ukrainian and Belarus are the most fitted in this case).

Most of these anthems were replaced during or after the dissolution of the USSR; Belarus, Kazakhstan (until 2006), Tajikistan, Turkmenistan (until 1996), and Uzbekistan kept the melodies, but with different lyrics. The Russian Federation itself had abandoned the Soviet hymn, replacing it with a tune by Glinka. However, with Vladimir Putin coming to power, the old Soviet tune was restored, with new lyrics written to it.

Anthems

Others
The "Anthem of the Karelo-Finnish SSR" was used for the Karelo-Finnish SSR before it was demoted to an ASSR within the Russian SFSR. With the exception of the Checheno-Ingush ASSR and the Tuvan ASSR, autonomous republics of the Soviet Union (ASSRs) did not have their own official anthems, although unofficial versions had been used by some.

Legal status
Like the hammer and sickle and red star, the public performance of the anthems of the Soviet republics and the anthem of the Soviet Union itself are considered by some as occupation symbols as well as symbols of totalitarianism and state terror by several countries formerly either members of or occupied by the Soviet Union. Accordingly, Latvia, Lithuania, Ukraine, and Estonia have banned those anthems amongst other things deemed to be symbols of fascism, socialism, communism, and the Soviet Union and its republics. In Poland, dissemination of items which are “media of fascist, communist, or other totalitarian symbolism” was criminalized in 1997. However, in 2011 the Constitutional Tribunal found this sanction to be unconstitutional. In contrast to this treatment of the symbolism, promotion of fascist, communist and other totalitarian ideology remains illegal. Those laws do not apply to the anthems of Russia, Belarus, Uzbekistan, Kazakhstan, and Tajikistan which have used the melody with different lyrics.

References

External links
 Audio recordings made by each republic's best national choir and orchestra in the 1970s-1980s; also instrumental versions by the Brass Band of the USSR Ministry of Defence from the 1968 Soviet LP.
 State Anthem of the Soviet Union — youtube.com

Soviet Republics